Tobías Andre Moriceau (born 9 April 1997) is an Argentine professional footballer who plays as a midfielder for Colegiales.

Career
Colegiales gave Moriceau his beginning in senior football. Alejandro Nanía promoted the midfielder into first-team football in March 2019, as he started Primera B Metropolitana matches against All Boys, Fénix and Almirante Brown; playing the full duration of all three. His next appearance arrived two months later against Atlanta.

Career statistics
.

References

External links

1997 births
Living people
Place of birth missing (living people)
Argentine footballers
Association football midfielders
Primera B Metropolitana players
Club Atlético Colegiales (Argentina) players